Harley Edward Sewell (April 18, 1931 – December 17, 2011) was an American football guard for the Detroit Lions (1953–1962), the Los Angeles Rams (1963). He was born in Jefferson County, Oklahoma, and attended the University of Texas.

He and his wife, Jean (Moloney), had three children, James, Janet, and Nathan. They resided in Arlington, Texas. He died Saturday, December 17, 2011.

College career
At Texas, Sewell was an outstanding linebacker, however, the Lions drafted him as an offensive guard. He was the Lions’ first round draft pick in 1953. Used in the role of pulling guard, Sewell "was noted for his extreme hustle" and speed in blocking. Later, he was referred to as "a 'hillbilly' kid."

Professional career
A member of the Lion teams during the 1950s and early 1960s, Harley was the best draft choice for Detroit out of any choices in 1953. He moved immediately into the starting spot at right guard as a rookie and remained there for the next ten campaigns. A tireless worker, Harley was one of the toughest and most conditioned Lions of his era. He once said at the peak of his career, "(I) never feel like I have a job cinched." While that attitude may have served to motivate him, his abilities were never questioned by either teammates or his coaches. "Harley has hustled for us every minute since he joined the Lions," said his former line coach Aldo Forte.

The 6-foot, 1-inch, 230-pound Sewell was a complete guard, equally skilled at either pass or run blocking. He was at his best when leading the running back on sweeps, inside traps, and counter plays. Harley's quick feet and acceleration allowed him to clear out larger defenders before they had time to counter his attack. Sewell was also a standout on special teams throughout his career. A regular on the punting and kickoff teams, he was once credited with 85% of the team's tackles on the kickoff unit in one season. Harley was a four-time Pro Bowl nominee during his career, making the season-ending trip after the 1957, 1958, 1959, and 1962 campaigns. He was inducted into the College Football Hall of Fame in 2000.

References

1931 births
2011 deaths
American football offensive linemen
College Football Hall of Fame inductees
Detroit Lions players
Los Angeles Rams players
People from Montague County, Texas
Players of American football from Texas
Texas Longhorns football players
Western Conference Pro Bowl players